William Jones (1760September 6, 1831) was an American politician.

Early career
Jones was born in Philadelphia in the Province of Pennsylvania. Apprenticed in a shipyard, during the American Revolutionary War, he saw combat in the battles of Trenton and Princeton and later served at sea. In the decades that followed the war, he was a successful merchant in Charleston, South Carolina, and in Philadelphia. He was elected as a Republican to the United States House of Representatives in 1800 and was offered the office of Secretary of the Navy in 1801, but declined and remained in Congress to the end of his term in 1803. In 1805, he was elected as a member of the American Philosophical Society.

Secretary of the Navy
With the War of 1812 raging, Jones became Secretary of the Navy in January 1813. His policies contributed greatly to American success on the Great Lakes and to a strategy of coastal defense and commerce raiding on the high seas. In late 1814, near the end of his term, he made recommendations on the reorganization of the Navy Department. These led to the establishment of the Board of Commissioners system which operated from 1815 until 1842.

Bank president
From May 1813 to February 1814, Jones also served as acting Secretary of the Treasury and in 1816 was appointed President of the Second Bank of the United States. He returned to commercial pursuits in 1819. Jones died in Bethlehem, Pennsylvania.

Legacy

The destroyer USS William Jones (DD-308) was named in his honor.

References

Further reading

External links

1760 births
1831 deaths
19th-century American politicians
Politicians from Philadelphia
People of colonial Pennsylvania
People of Pennsylvania in the American Revolution
United States Secretaries of the Navy
American people of the War of 1812
Madison administration cabinet members
Continental Army soldiers
Colonial American merchants
Democratic-Republican Party members of the United States House of Representatives from Pennsylvania
Burials at St. Peter's churchyard, Philadelphia
Acting United States Secretaries of the Treasury